Durieu is an unincorporated predominantly farming community, located around five kilometers northeast of Mission, British Columbia, Canada in Area F of the Fraser Valley Regional District of that province's Lower Mainland at an elevation of between twenty and forty meters above sea level. Durieu falls mostly within zone 1 of the Agricultural Land Reserve. Sited in the middle of Hatzic Valley it has few services other than a store, gas station, feed co-op, defunct elementary school and community hall.

Hatzic Prairie's former post office was renamed to Durieu Post Office in remembrance of Archbishop Pierre-Paul Durieu around 1910. This in turn led to British Columbian government officials and cartographers using the name "Durieu" to describe the local settlement from 1939. Durieu currently holds community-level status per the BC Geographic names office.

References

Lower Mainland
Unincorporated settlements in British Columbia
Populated places in the Fraser Valley Regional District
Designated places in British Columbia